Abū al-Najīb Abd al-Qādir Suhrawardī (1097–1168) was a Sunni Persian Sufi who was born in Sohrevard, near Zanjan, and founded the Suhrawardiyya Sufi order. He studied Islamic law in Baghdad, later becoming professor of Shafi'ite law at the Nizamiyya school in the same city.

He then later on set up a retreat by the river Tigris, where he gathered disciples, which eventually came to be the Sufi order of Suhrawardiyya which included [Ahmed Al-Ghazali], the younger brother of Abu Hamid Al-Ghazali. His paternal nephew Shahab al-Din Abu Hafs Umar Suhrawardi expanded the order. His name is also sometimes transcribed as Diya al-din Abu 'n-Najib as-Suhrawardi.

See also
Suhrawardiyya

References 

Iranian Sufis
12th-century Muslim scholars of Islam
1097 births
1168 deaths
12th-century Iranian people
Founders of Sufi orders
Iranian Muslim mystics